Pterocallis is a genus of true bugs belonging to the family Aphididae.

The species of this genus are found in Europe, Northern America and New Zealand.

Species:
 Pterocallis affinis
 Pterocallis albida Börner, 1940

References

Aphididae